Sergei Dmitryevich Sazonov GCB (Russian: Сергей Дмитриевич Сазонов; 10 August 1860 in Ryazan Governorate 11 December 1927) was a Russian statesman and diplomat who served as Foreign Minister from November 1910 to July 1916. The degree of his involvement in the events leading up to the outbreak of World War I is a matter of keen debate, with some historians putting the blame for an early and provocative mobilization squarely on Sazonov's shoulders, and others maintaining that his chief preoccupation was "to reduce the temperature of international relations, especially in the Balkans".

Early career 

Of lesser noble background, Sazonov was the brother-in-law of Prime Minister Pyotr Stolypin, who did his best to further Sazonov's career. Having graduated from the Tsarskoye Selo Lyceum, Sazonov served in the London embassy, and the diplomatic mission to the Vatican, of which he became the chief in March 1906. On 26 June 1909 Sazonov was recalled to St. Petersburg and appointed Assistant Foreign Minister. Before long he replaced Alexander Izvolsky as Foreign Minister and followed a policy along the lines laid down by Stolypin.

Foreign Minister

Potsdam Agreement 

Just before he was officially appointed foreign minister, Sazonov attended a meeting between Nicholas II of Russia and Wilhelm II of Germany in Potsdam on 4–6 November 1910. This move was intended to chastise the British for their perceived betrayal of Russia's interests during the Bosnian crisis. Indeed, Britain's Foreign Secretary was seriously alarmed by this token of a "German-Russian Détente".

The two monarchs discussed the ambitious German project of the Baghdad Railway, widely expected to give Berlin considerable geopolitical clout in the Fertile Crescent. Against the background of the Persian Constitutional Revolution, Russia was anxious to control the prospective railway branch from Tehran to Khanaqin, on the Turco-Persian frontier, financed by Russian and German capital; and Germany to link this branch to the Baghdad Railway.  The two powers settled their differences in the Potsdam Agreement, signed on 19 August 1911, Germany giving Russia a free hand in Northern Iran and Russia in turn recognizing Germany's rights on the Baghdad Railway. Sazonov was sick during that time, his office was led by Anatoly Neratov during his absence. However, as Sazonov hoped, the first railway connecting Persia to Europe would provide Russia with a lever of influence over its southern neighbour.

Notwithstanding the promising beginning, the Russian-German relations disintegrated in 1913, when the Kaiser sent one of his generals to reorganize the Turkish army and to supervise the garrison in Constantinople on request of the Ottomans, remarking that "the German flag will soon fly over the fortifications of the Bosphorus", a vital trade artery which accounted for two fifths of Russia's exports.

Alliance with Japan 
Despite his fixation on Russian-German affairs, Sazonov was also mindful of Russian interests in the Far East. In the wake of the disastrous Russo-Japanese War, he steadily made friendly overtures toward Japan. As a result, a secret convention was signed in St. Petersburg on 8 July 1912 concerning the delimitation of spheres of interest in Inner Mongolia. Both powers determined to keep Inner Mongolia politically separate from Outer Mongolia. Four years later, Sazonov congratulated himself on concluding a Russian-Japanese defensive alliance (3 July 1916)  aimed at securing the interests of both powers in China.

World War I 

In the run-up to a major military conflict in Europe, another concern of the Russian minister was to isolate Austria-Hungary, mainly by playing the Balkan card against the dwindling power of the Habsburgs. Since Sazonov was moderate in his Balkan politics, his ministry "came under frequent nationalist fire for failing to conform to a rigid pan-Slav line".

While the extremist agents like Nicholas Hartwig aspired to solidify the conflicting South Slavic states into a confederacy under the aegis of the Tsar, there is no indication that Sazonov personally shared or encouraged these views. Regardless, both Austria and Germany were persuaded that Russia fomented Pan-Slavism in Belgrade and other Slavic capitals, a belligerent attitude in some measure responsible for the Assassination in Sarajevo and the outbreak of the Great War.

Serbia was largely viewed as being within Russia's sphere of influence and there was significant support from the political class and the broader population for the Serbian cause. That caused Russia to defend Serbia against Austria after the assassination of the Austrian Archduke Franz Ferdinand. Sazonov warned Austria in 1914 that Russia, "would respond militarily to any action against the client state."

As World War I unwound, Sazonov worked to prevent Romania from joining the Central Powers and wrested in March 1915 an acquiescence from Russia's allies to the post-war occupation of the Bosphorus, Constantinople, and the European side of the Dardanelles. On 1 October 1914 Sazonov gave a written guarantee to Romania that, if the country sided with the Entente, it would be enlarged at the expense of the Austrian dominions in Transylvania, Bukovina, and the Banat. In general, "his calm and courteous manner did much to maintain fruitful Allied relations".

He accepted  an announcement  of the professor  Thomas Garrigue Masaryk for Russian army soldiers to not shoot on the Czech refugees in October  1914.

Sazonov was viewed favourably in London, but the Germanophile faction of Tsarina Alexandra fiercely urged his dismissal, which did materialize on 10 July and only after the minister had aired a proposal to grant autonomy to Poland.

Later life 

Early in 1917, Sazonov was appointed ambassador in Great Britain, but found it necessary to remain in Russia, where he witnessed the February Revolution. 

He was opposed to Bolshevism, advised Anton Denikin on international affairs, and was foreign minister in the anti-Bolshevik government of Admiral Kolchak. In 1919 he represented the Provisional All-Russian Government, the Allied recognized government of Russia, at the Paris Peace Conference. Sazonov spent his last years in France writing a book of memoirs. He died in Nice where he is buried.

See also
 Russian entry into World War I

References

Further reading
 Gooch, G.P. Before the war: studies in diplomacy (2 vol 1936, 1938) online vol 2 pp 289–370.

External links
 

1860 births
1927 deaths
People from Ryazan Governorate
Russian nobility
Foreign ministers of the Russian Empire
Ambassadors of the Russian Empire to the United Kingdom
Russian anti-communists
Tsarskoye Selo Lyceum alumni
Russian people of World War I
Honorary Knights Grand Cross of the Order of the Bath
Emigrants from the Russian Empire to France